Alan Robertson (born 17 February 1994) is a South African professional soccer player who plays as a defender for Malaysian Super League side Kedah.

References

External links

1994 births
Living people
South African soccer players
Association football defenders
Barnet F.C. players
University of Pretoria F.C. players
AmaZulu F.C. players
Stellenbosch F.C. players

South African Premier Division players
National First Division players

Expatriate footballers in England
Expatriate footballers in the Philippines